Liga 2 (English: League Two) is the second-tier of the football competition system in Indonesia, organized by PSSI. Before 2017, this competition was named the Liga Indonesia Premier Division (from 1994 to 2007, it was the top-tier division in the Indonesian football league system).

History 
The competition is usually divided into several groups because of geographic and number of participants factors.

As a result of continuing conflict between PT Liga Indonesia (LI) and PT Liga Prima Indonesia Sportindo (LPIS), there were two different Liga Indonesia Premier Division being organized for 2011–12 and 2013 season, one for the Indonesia Super League and the other for Indonesian Premier League. Starting in the 2014 season Premier Division is organized again by PT Liga Indonesia after the dissolution of LPIS.

Prior to the formation of Indonesia Super League in 2008, Premier Division was the Indonesian top-flight football league. Along with Indonesia Super League, Premier Division is a fully professional competition.

In January 2017, PSSI renamed the competition to Liga 2.

In March 2023, PSSI would establish a new operator for the competition, as a separator from PT Liga Indonesia Baru which runs Liga 1, and they would rename the competition to Liga Nusantara.

Current members

Championship history

First-tier era

Second-tier era

Title sponsors 
 Dunhill (1994–1996)
 Kansas (1996–1997)
 Bank Mandiri (1999–2004)
 Djarum Super (2005–2008)
 Esia (2008–2009)
 Extra Joss (2009–2010)
 Ti-Phone (2010–2011)

Broadcasting partner 
 TVRI (1994–2002)
 ANTV (1994–2002, 2004–2007, 2008–2013)
 RCTI (2000–2002)
Kompas TV (2020)
MNC Vision Networks (2020–2021)
 SCTV (2003)
 Indosiar (1999–2001, 2004, 2021–present)
 Trans TV (2004)
 TV7 (2005)
Lativi/tvOne (2006–2007, 2013, 2017–2019)
First Media and Big TV (2014)
OrangeTV (2017–2018)
Telkom Indonesia (2018–present)
iflix (2017–2018)
Vidio (2018–present)
Nex Parabola (2019, 2021–present)
Moji (2021–present)
Mentari TV (2022–present)

: As the first tier.

: As the second tier.

Awards

Best players 
First-tier era

Second-tier era

Top scorers 
First-tier era

Second-tier era

References

External links 
 Official website of PT Liga Indonesia Baru 
 Official website of PSSI 

 
2
 
2
Sports leagues established in 1994
Indo
Professional sports leagues in Indonesia